Aleksandar Tišma (16 January 1924 – 15 February 2003) was a Serbian novelist.

Biography
Tišma was born in Horgoš, Kanjiža on the present-day border of Serbia and Hungary, to a Serbian father and a Hungarian-speaking Jewish mother. He completed his elementary and middle school education in Novi Sad before going on to study economy and French language and literature in Budapest during World War II, finally graduating in Germanistics from the University of Belgrade Faculty of Philology. From 1945 to 1949 he worked as a journalist for Slobodna Vojvodina and Borba newspapers, and then as editor and redactor at Matica srpska until his retirement in 1982.

He became a corresponding member of the Vojvodina Academy of Sciences and Arts (VANU) in 1979 and was promoted into a regular member in 1984, and subsequently became a regular member of the Serbian Academy of Sciences and Arts (SANU) upon their fusion 1992. From 2002, he was also a member of the Academy of Arts, Berlin.

Tišma's works were concerned with themes of humanity's search for freedom, and suffering, violence, horror and guilt people encounter along the way. Along with Czesław Miłosz, Danilo Kiš and György Konrád, his works are sometimes classified as part of "Mitteleuropa" literature—dark and contemplative, yet humanistic and thought-provoking.

In political affairs, Tišma often publicly supported and acted in favor of pro-democratic movements in Serbia, although he was reluctant to openly join any political organization. In 1993, as a sign of disagreement with Slobodan Milošević's regime and increasing nationalist hysteria in the country, he left Serbia and lived in self-imposed exile in France until 1996. He died in 2003, aged 79, in Novi Sad.

His works were translated into 17 languages. Among other awards, he received the Novi Sad October Award, the NIN Award for best novel of the year (for The Use of Man, 1976), the Andrić Award and the Austrian State Prize for European Literature (1995). He also translated works of other authors from German and Hungarian into Serbian, notably Imre Kertész's novel Fatelessness.

Bibliography

Novels 
 Za crnom devojkom (1969). After a Black-Haired Girl
 Knjiga o Blamu (1972). The Book of Blam, trans. Michael Henry Heim (Harcourt, 1998; New York Review Books, 2016).
 Upotreba čoveka (1976). The Use of Man, trans. Ian Johnson (Harcourt, 1988) and Bernard Johnson (Faber and Faber, 1990; New York Review Books, 2014).
 Begunci (1981). Fugitives
 Vere i zavere (1983). Faith and Treason
Kapo (1987). Kapo, trans. Richard Williams (Harcourt, 1993; New York Review Books, 2020).
 Široka vrata (1989). The Wide Door
 Koje volimo (1990). Those We Love

Collections of short stories 
 Krivice (1965). Guilts
 Nasilje (1965). Violence
 Mrtvi ugao (1973). The Dead Angle
 Povratak miru (1977). Return to the Peace
 Škola bezbožništva (1978). School of Atheism
 Hiljadu i druga noć (1987). A Thousand and Second Night

Poetry 
 Naseljeni svet (1956). Inhabited World
 Krčma (1961). Pub

Other 
 Drugde (1963). Elsewhere, travels
 Šta sam govorio (1996). What I Spoke, interviews
 Dnevnik 1942-2001 (2001). Diary, interviews

References 

 Odlazak mudrog skeptika, Vasa Pavković, NIN, 2003-02-20 (Obituary) 
 Pisac na barikadama, Mihal Ramač, Danas, 2003-03-01 
 Interview 

1924 births
2003 deaths
People from Kanjiža
Serbian writers
University of Belgrade Faculty of Philology alumni
Members of the Serbian Academy of Sciences and Arts
Serbian Jews
Jewish writers
Matica srpska
20th-century Serbian people
Yugoslav writers
20th-century male writers
Yugoslav Jews